Giovanni Berlinguer  (9 July 1924 – 6 April 2015) was an Italian politician, humanist and professor of social medicine.

Life and career
He was born in Sassari, Sardinia, the son of Mario Berlinguer. A physician and professor of public health, he worked first in social medicine at the University of Sassari (1969–1974) and then in occupational health at the University "La Sapienza" Rome (1975–1999).

Like his brother Enrico, Giovanni Berlinguer was a major figure in the Italian Communist Party (PCI) and was elected to the Chamber of Deputies in 1972, 1976 and 1979 and to the Senate in 1983 and 1987. He ran for secretary of the Democrats of the Left (DS) in 2001, and was defeated by Piero Fassino 61.8% to 34.1%.

From 2004 to 2009 he was a Member of the European Parliament representing the DS and sits with the Party of European Socialists group. At the convening of the Parliament on 20 July 2004 he was found to be the oldest member, and as such presided over the Parliament during the election of Josep Borrell Fontelles in 2004 and Hans-Gert Pöttering in 2007 as President of the Parliament.

He was in charge of the first National Health Plan in the context of the Economic Development Program adopted by the Italian Parliament (1968). Member of the National Health Council between 1994 and 1996. Vice-chairman (1992–1995) and chairman (1999–2001) of the National Bioethics Committee (CNB).  Member of the UNESCO International Bioethics Committee (2001–2007) and of the Commission on the Social Determinants of Health of the World Health Organisation. He was rapporteur on the first project (2003) of the UNESCO "Universal Declaration on Bioethics".

In the years of his chairmanship the CNB strategy underwent some noteworthy changes. Priority was no longer given to “frontier bioethics”, but to its link with “everyday bioethics”, which Berlinguer articulated in his 2000 book Bioetica quotidiana (Everyday bioethics). This change implied that the CNB opinions were “open” to contributions not only of specialists, but also of lay people, and new channels of communication were established with the public at large. The democratic guidance had comments and a significant impact at the local, national and international level.

He died in Rome at the age of 90.

Honors 

 Cavaliere di Gran Croce OMRI,
 Doctorat honoris causa, Université de Montréal (1996) and University of Brasilia (1999)

See also
 2004 European Parliament election in Italy

References

External links

1924 births
2015 deaths
People from Sassari
Italian people of Catalan descent
Italian Communist Party politicians
Democratic Party of the Left politicians
Democrats of the Left politicians
Democratic Left (Italy) politicians
Left Ecology Freedom politicians
Deputies of Legislature VI of Italy
Deputies of Legislature VII of Italy
Deputies of Legislature VIII of Italy
Senators of Legislature IX of Italy
Senators of Legislature X of Italy
Democrats of the Left MEPs
MEPs for Italy 2004–2009
Politicians of Sardinia
Knights Grand Cross of the Order of Merit of the Italian Republic